This is a list of notable translator and interpreter organizations (professional associations, not commercial translation agencies) around the world.

Most of them are International Federation of Translators members as well.

Worldwide
 International Federation of Translators
 International Association of Professional Translators and Interpreters
 International Association of Conference Interpreters
 International Association for Translation and Intercultural Studies
 The American Association of Language Specialists
 Translators Without Borders
 European Society for Translation Studies
 Tremédica
 World Association of Sign Language Interpreters
 AudioVisual Translators Europe (https://avteurope.eu/)

Argentina
 Argentine Association of Technical-Scientific Translators (AATT)
 Argentine Association of Translators and Interpreters

Australia
 Australian Institute of Interpreters and Translators

Canada
 Association of Visual Language Interpreters of Canada
 Canadian Translators, Terminologists and Interpreters Council
 Literary Translators' Association of Canada
 At province level:
 Ordre des traducteurs, terminologues et interprètes agréés du Québec

China
 Translators Association of China

France
 Union Nationale des Experts Traducteurs Interprètes près les Cours d'Appel
 Association Française des Interprètes de Conférence Indépendants
 Société française des traducteurs
 Association des traducteurs et éditeurs en sciences sociales

Japan
See List of Japanese interpreting and translation associations

New Zealand
 New Zealand Society of Translators and Interpreters

North Macedonia
 Macedonian Translators Association

Norway
 Norwegian Association of Literary Translators
 Norwegian Association of Audiovisual Translators

Poland
Polish Association of Conference Interpreters PSTK

South Africa
 South African Translators' Institute

Portugal
ATAV (Portuguese Audiovisual Translators Association)

APTRAD (Portuguese Translators and Interpreters Association)

 Portuguese Translators Association (APT)

Spain
 Associations at a national level:
 Asetrad (Spanish Association of Translators, Copy-editors, and Interpreters)
 ATRAE (Spanish Association of Audiovisual Translators)
 Regional associations:
 APTIC (Professional Association of Translators and Interpreters of Catalonia)
 EIZIE (Association of Translators, Correctors and Interpreters of the Basque Language)

Russia
 Union of Translators of Russia

United Kingdom
See List of UK interpreting and translation associations

United States
 American Literary Translators Association
 American Translators Association
 National Association of Judiciary Interpreters and Translators
 Registry of Interpreters for the Deaf
 The American Association of Language Specialists
 There are several associations at regional, state and local level, such as:
Colorado Translators Association
 Florida Registry of Interpreters for the Deaf
Midwest Association of Translators & Interpreters
New England Translators Association
Northern California Translators Association
Northwest Translators and Interpreters Society
Northeast Ohio Translators Association
Community and Court Interpreters of Ohio
Chicago Area Translators and Interpreters Association

Uruguay
 Colegio de Traductores Públicos del Uruguay

 
Translators and interpreters
 
Associations